Sadat-e Nejat Kuchak (also Romanized as Sādāt-e Nejāt Kūchak) is a village in Ahudasht Rural District, Shavur District, Shush County, Khuzestan Province, Iran. At the 2006 census, its population was 27, in 4 families.

References 

Populated places in Shush County